Hexwood is a 1993 fantasy/science fiction novel for young adults.  It is by British author Diana Wynne Jones.

The book was dedicated to author Neil Gaiman, who later wrote a poem about the honor and gave it to her.

Jones said of the book "it's very strange but people who've read it so far say that it's absolutely fascinating, I mean it's really weird — I couldn't begin to describe it. It demanded to be written back to front and sideways."

Plot summary 

The Sector Controller, who is responsible for overseeing Earth, among other worlds, receives a message that tells him that a mysterious machine called the Bannus has been activated (against orders) at Hexwood Farm Estate near London by the man who was responsible for maintaining the facility. Somehow, the Bannus has trapped both that man and an entire maintenance team inside the Estate. Following instructions in case of such an accident, the Sector Controller sends a message to the Reigners, the five people who rule the galaxy.

In a wood, an amnesiac boy meets an android. The android, who is called Yam, tells him that his name is Hume, because he is a human.

In a small village near London, a teenage girl, Ann Stavely, recovers from a serious fever. While ill, she talks with the four voices in her head: The King, The Prisoner, The Boy, and The Slave. Through her window, she witnesses some mysterious comings and goings at nearby Hexwood Farm Estate; a van, with a symbol like a pair of unbalanced scales on the side, pulls up and people go in, but they do not come out again. After many different people go in, but none come out, Ann becomes curious, and is determined to find out more.

The next day, greatly recovered, she explores the tiny woods beside Hexwood Farm. When she enters it, she finds that the woods have expanded, and she encounters a futuristic chamber with a famished, exceptionally tall and skeletal man - Mordion Agenos - inside. He claims he has been asleep for centuries, but Ann knows she saw him enter Hexwood Farm just a few days ago.

Mordion creates a boy from a pool of his and Ann's mingled blood, and sends him off on his own into the woods. The boy appears to be Hume, who we have already met in Chapter 1. Ann is horrified by Mordion's callous attitude and tells him that he must look after Hume - after all, he created him.

Ann visits Mordion and Hume several times in the woods over the next few days. While she is in her own town, she and her brother see more and more people appearing to enter Hexwood Farm Estate and still none ever emerge. During one of her visits to Mordion and Hume, she helps Hume recover Yam from what looks like a future, ruined Hexwood Farm, where they encounter and escape from armored men armed with crossbows. Yam then tells Mordion, Ann, and Hume that they are all in the field of the Bannus, which warps time and space in order to run scenarios for some mysterious purpose. This is why things seem to be happening out of order.

Later, we meet the five Reigners, tyrants who have ruled the galaxy for over a thousand years. They are very concerned about the Bannus, which, before they seized power, was used to pick new Reigners. Reigner Two and the Reigner's Servant (Mordion) have disappeared while trying to deactivate the Bannus. The remaining Reigners go to Earth (Reigners Four and Five alone, but then Three and One go together) to turn off the Bannus, but they too get caught in the Bannus' field of influence, forget who they are, and find themselves in the huge forest, which is somehow the little wood beside Hexwood Farm.

When Reigner One and Reigner Three come to Earth, they take a girl from one of the major guild houses (who works in their basement, managing costuming for when the Reigners or their servants need to travel to a distant world) as a luggage-carrying assistant. This assistant, Vierran of House Guaranty, is a young woman in her twenties who considers herself a friend of the Reigner's Servant, Mordion Agenos.

The Bannus, a cyborg designed to pick new Reigners, who the current Reigners cheated and locked away, is playing with the minds of all the characters and running scenarios in order to determine who the next five Reigners should be, while getting his revenge on the current Reigners. The Bannus has confused several of the characters as to who they are in order to run these scenarios. Vierran and Ann turn out to be different representations of the same person, Vierran of the House of Guaranty. Mordion Agenos is the Reigners Servant, and by looking after Hume, is making up for when he was a child and failed to protect other children in the Reigners care. Hume turns out to be Merlin, and "Ann's" brother is discovered to be Fitela, a dragon-slayer mentioned in "Beowulf". Yam, in a cunning twist, turns out to be the Bannus itself; by getting Mordion to repair him, he was returning himself to full power. Several other characters in the book turn out to be other legendary figures of note, the Reigners all get their comeuppance, and Mordion and Vierran are selected by the Bannus to be two of the five new Reigners.

Principal characters

Characters' true identities are shown in bold.

Mordion Agenos - The Reigners' Servant. Known to his voices as the Slave. Later appointed as First Reigner.
Ann Stavely - Vierran, of the House of Guaranty. Known to her voices as the Girl Child. Later the Second Reigner.
Hume - Martellian Pender, also known as Merlin, of Arthurian legend. Known to his voices as the Prisoner. Later Third Reigner.
Sir Artegal - Arthur Pendragon, aka King Arthur. Known to his voices as the King. Later Fourth Reigner.
Martin Stavely - "Ann's" brother. Actually Fitela Wolfson, a dragonslayer who briefly appears in Beowulf, and a descendant of Merlin/Hume. Known to his voices as the Boy, and later the Fifth Reigner.
Yam (Yamaha) - The Bannus. A machine, designed to make sure that the process of selection of the Reigners would be absolutely fair.
The Dragon - Orm Pender, the original Reigner One.
King Ambitas - The original Reigner Two. Ambitas and Mordion represent different aspects of the Fisher King in the Arthurian legends.
Morgan La Trey - The original Reigner Three.
Sir Fors -  Reigner Four
Sir Harrisoun - Harrison Scudamore, the new and unpleasant owner of Hexwood Farm Estate. He started the Bannus running again, in order to play a role-playing game, preferably involving hobbits on a Grail Quest.
Lady Sylvia - Siri, of the House of Guaranty. Vierran's cousin.

Reception
It received mostly positive reviews: Kirkus Reviews called it "an elaborate, fascinating, and superbly crafted adventure", School Library Journal praised it for its "knife-sharp prose" and for being a "marvelously mind-stretching" book, while Booklist said it was a "satisfying tale" and that "[t]he action is fast paced, the mysterious circumstances are compelling, and there's even a nice bit of humor."
Books For Keeps were more noncommittal, noting simply that it would need a "doughty readership", describing the novel as "a demanding read" with "page after page of challenging ideas". But Publishers Weekly were critical of the novel, due to its "muddled narrative" and "confusing finale".

References

External links 

1993 British novels
1993 fantasy novels
1993 science fiction novels
Young adult fantasy novels
British young adult novels
British fantasy novels
Children's science fiction novels
British science fiction novels
Novels by Diana Wynne Jones
Methuen Publishing books
Modern Arthurian fiction